The philosophy, theology, and fundamental theory of Catholic canon law are the fields of philosophical, theological (ecclesiological), and legal scholarship which concern the place of canon law in the nature of the Catholic Church, both as a natural and as a supernatural entity. Philosophy and theology shape the concepts and self-understanding of canon law as the law of both a human organization and as a supernatural entity, since the Catholic Church believes that Jesus Christ instituted the church by direct divine command, while the fundamental theory of canon law is a meta-discipline of the "triple relationship between theology, philosophy, and canon law".

Philosophy of canon law

A triple species of human [positive] law is distinguished: ecclesiastical or canon law, civil law, and the law of nations. Canon law and civil law differ among themselves partly by nature of origin, partly by nature of object, and partly by nature of end:
They differ in origin: for the origin of the civil power is from God the author of nature; while the origin of the ecclesiastical power is from God the contributor of supernatural grace.
They differ in object: because canon law regulates spiritual and sacred matters, while civil law regulates matters temporal and political. 
They differ in end: for canon law especially aims at the eternal happiness of people; civil law, however, aims at their temporal happiness.

Aristotelian-Thomistic jurisprudence

Although canonical jurisprudential theory generally follows the principles of Aristotelian-Thomistic legal philosophy, Thomas Aquinas never explicitly discusses the place of canon law in his Treatise on Law (a small section of his Summa Theologiæ). However, Aquinas himself was influenced by canon law; the fourth clause of his famous 4-part definition of law—the requirement of promulgation—is taken from the canonists, and the sed contra of his article on promulgation cites Gratian (the "Father of Canon Law") as an authority. According to René A. Wormser,

While the term "law" is never explicitly defined in the 1983 Code, the Catechism of the Catholic Church cites Aquinas in defining law as "...an ordinance of reason for the common good, promulgated by the one who is in charge of the community" and reformulates it as "...a rule of conduct enacted by competent authority for the sake of the common good." Some authors, however, dispute the applicability of the Thomistic definition of law to canon law, arguing that its application would impoverish ecclesiology and corrupt the very supernatural end of canon law.

Jus Publicum Ecclesiasticum
With the birth of the omni-competent sovereign nation-state in the seventeenth century, which claimed exclusive jurisdiction over all its citizens, the dual or concurrent jurisdiction of the Catholic Church and the sovereign state was intellectually and legally challenged. In the new legal and politico-religious climate in the period following the Protestant Reformation, the newly formed sovereign states of Europe claimed more jurisdiction over areas of law and legal practice which had traditionally been under the jurisdiction of the church. In this post-Reformation period of political change, canonical jurists sought to defend within the categories of the public law the right of the Catholic Church to make and enforce law. Hence the name, jus publicum ecclesiasticum—"public ecclesiastical law". 

 

The justification of the legal powers of the Catholic Church would now be defended along the lines of the sovereign state's justification for its own legal powers, and the Catholic Church would be considered a concurrent and complementary Communitas Perfecta in the realm of the supernatural end of man to that of the civil sovereign state in the realm of the natural end of man.

Communitas Perfecta

Many canonists, in the years preceding the Second Vatican Council, considered the justification and basis for canon law being a true legal system to be that the Catholic Church was established by Jesus Christ as a Communitas Perfecta, and as such was a true human society which had the right to make human law.

Fernando della Rocca asserted that it is a "fundamental principle of canon law which insists on the right of the Church as a perfect society, to determine, particularly in the field of legislation, the limits of its own power." Even Pope Benedict XV, in his apostolic constitution promulgating the 1917 Code of Canon Law, attributed the legislative authority of the church to it being founded by Jesus Christ with all the requirements for a Communitas Perfecta.

Theology of canon law

In the decades following the Second Vatican Council, many canonists called for a more theological, rather than philosophical, conception of canon law, acknowledging the "triple relationship between theology, philosophy, and canon law".

Pope Benedict XVI, in his address of 21 January 2012 before the Roman Rota, taught that canonical laws can only be interpreted and fully understood within the Catholic Church in the light of her mission and ecclesiological structure.

Some authors conceive of canon law as essentially theological and the discipline of canon law as a theological subdiscipline, but Msgr. Carlos José Errázuriz contends that "in a certain sense, all postconciliar canonical scholarship has shown a theological concern in the widest sense, that is, a tendency to determine more clearly the place of the juridical in the mystery of the Church."

Ecclesiological inspiration of the 1983 Code

In view of the decision to reform the existing 1983 Code, the Second Vatican Council, in the decree Optatam totius (§16), ordered that "the teaching of canon law [...] should take into account the mystery of the Church, according to the dogmatic constitution De Ecclesia".

The 1917 Code was structured according to the Roman law division of "norms, persons, things, procedures, penalties", while the 1983 Code, in total contrast, was deliberately given a much more doctrinal-theological structure. John Paul II described the ecclesiological inspiration of the new code of canon law in this way:

Thus the 1983 Code is configured, as far as possible, according to the "mystery of the Church", the most significant divisions—Books II, III, and IV—corresponding to the munus regendi, the munus sanctificandi, and the munus docendi (the "missions" of governance, of worship/sanctification, and of teaching) which in turn derive from the kingly, the priestly and the prophetic roles or functions of Christ.

Fundamental theory of canon law

The fundamental theory of canon law is a discipline covering the basis of canon law in the very nature of the church. Fundamental theory is a newer discipline that takes as is object "the existence and nature of what is juridical in the Church of Jesus Christ." The discipline seeks to provide a theoretical basis for the coexistence and complementarity of canon law and the Catholic Church, and it seeks to refute the "canonical antijuridicism" (the belief that law of the church constitutes a contradiction in terms; that law and church are radically incompatible) of the various heretical movements and of the Protestant Reformation on the one hand, and on the other, the antijuridicism deriving from a belief that all law is identifiable with the law of the state; that in order to be true law, the state must be its maker. The discipline seeks to better explain the nature of law in the church and engages in theological discussions in post-conciliar Catholicism and seeks to combat "postconciliar antijuridicism".

Notes

References

Bibliography
Aquinas, Thomas. "St. Thomas Aquinas: Summa Theologiæ, Volume 28: Law and Political Theory (Ia2æ. 90-97); Latin text. English translation, Introduction, Notes, Appendices & Glossary [by] Thomas Gilby O.P.", Blackfriars (Cambridge: Eyre and Spottiswoode Limited, 1966).
Aymans, Winfried. Ecclesiological Implications of the New Legislation (essay published in Jordan Hite, T.O.R., & Daniel J. Ward, O.S.B., Readings, Cases, Materials in Canon Law: A Textbook for Ministerial Students, Revised Edition (Collegeville, MN: The Liturgical Press, 1990).
Bargilliat, M., “Prælectiones Juris Canonici—Tomus Primus” (Parisiis: Berche et Tralin, Editores, 1909).
Benedict XVI, Pope. Address of His Holiness Benedict XVI for the Inauguration of the Judicial Year of the Tribunal of the Roman Rota, Clementine Hall, 21 January 2012. https://w2.vatican.va/content/benedict-xvi/en/speeches/2012/january/documents/hf_ben-xvi_spe_20120121_rota-romana.html Accessed 29 March 2016.
Caparros, Ernest. Exegetical Commentary on the Code of Canon Law, Volume I: Prepared under the Responsibility of the Martín de Azpilcueta Institute, Faculty of Canon Law, University of Navarre (Chicago, Illinois: Midwest Theological Forum, 2004) Edited by Ángel Marzoa, Jorge Miras and Rafael Rodríguez-Ocaña (English language edition General editor: Ernest Caparros; Review coordinator: Patrick Lagges).
Della Rocca, Fernando. Manual of Canon Law (Milwaukee: The Bruce Publishing Company, 1959) translated by Rev. Anselm Thatcher, O.S.B.
Errázuriz M., Carlos José. Justice in the Church: A Fundamental Theory of Canon Law (Montreal: Wilson & Lefleur Ltée, 2009) trans. Jean Gray in collaboration with Michael Dunnigan.
Ferguson, John H., and McHenry, Dean E. The American Federal Government: Third Edition (McGraw-Hil Series in Political Science) (New York: McGraw-Hill Book Company, Inc., 1953).
Orsy, Ladislas. Towards a Theological Conception of Canon Law (essay published in Jordan Hite, T.O.R., & Daniel J. Ward, O.S.B., Readings, Cases, Materials in Canon Law: A Textbook for Ministerial Students, Revised Edition (Collegeville, MN: The Liturgical Press, 1990).
Peters, Dr. Edward N., translator, The 1917 or Pio-Benedictine Code of Canon Law: in English Translation with Extensive Scholarly Apparatus (Ignatius Press, 2001).
Peters, Dr. Edward N., JD, JCD, Ref. Sig. Ap., CanonLaw.info
Wormser, René A., The Story of the LAW and the Men Who Made It—From the Earliest Times to the Present: Revised and Updated Edition of The Law (New York: Simon and Schuster, 1962).
Catechism of the Catholic Church at Vatican.va

Canon law of the Catholic Church

c
Thomistic jurisprudence